Casimir Betel (born 20 August 1997) is a Chadian taekwondo practitioner. He won a bronze medal in the 2019 African Games competing in the men's –58 kg category.BETEL, Casimir. Taekwondo-data.com

References

Living people
1997 births
African Games bronze medalists for Chad
African Games medalists in taekwondo
Chadian male taekwondo practitioners
Competitors at the 2019 African Games
African Taekwondo Championships medalists